Otto II (7 April 1206 – 29 November 1253), called the Illustrious, was the Duke of Bavaria from 1231 and Count Palatine of the Rhine from 1214. He was the son of Louis I and Ludmilla of Bohemia and a member of the Wittelsbach dynasty.

The poet Reinbot von Dürne was active at his court.

Life 
Otto was born at Kelheim.

At the age of sixteen, he was married to Agnes of the Palatinate, a granddaughter of Duke Henry the Lion and Conrad of Hohenstaufen. With this marriage, the Wittelsbach inherited the Palatinate and kept it as a Wittelsbach possession until 1918. Since that time also the lion has become a heraldic symbol in the coat of arms for Bavaria and the Palatinate.

Otto acquired the rich regions of Bogen in 1240, and Andechs and Ortenburg in 1248 as possessions for the Wittelsbach and extended his power base in Bavaria this way. With the county of Bogen the Wittelsbach acquired also the white and blue coloured lozenge flag which since that time has been the flag of Bavaria (and of the Palatinate).

After a dispute with emperor Frederick II was ended, he joined the Hohenstaufen party in 1241. His daughter, Elizabeth, was married to Frederick's son Conrad IV. Because of this, Otto was excommunicated by the pope.

He died in Landshut in 1253. Like his forefathers, Otto was buried in the crypt of Scheyern Abbey.

Family and children 
Otto married Agnes, the daughter of Henry V, Count Palatine of the Rhine (a son of Henry the Lion) and Agnes of Hohenstaufen, in Worms in 1222. Their children were:
 Louis II, Duke of Bavaria (13 April 1229, Heidelberg – 2 February 1294, Heidelberg).
 Henry XIII, Duke of Bavaria (19 November 1235, Landshut – 3 February 1290, Burghausen.
 Elisabeth of Bavaria, Queen of Germany (c. 1227, Landshut – 9 October 1273)
 Sophie (1236, Landshut – 9 August 1289, Castle Hirschberg), married 1258 to Count Gerhard IV of Sulzbach and Hirschberg.
 Agnes (c. 1240–c. 1306), Nun in Segenstal Abbey

Otto had a daughter who died young and whose name is not known. The Annales sancti Rudberti Salisburgenses record her betrothal in 1235 to Conrad, who later married Elisabeth.

References 
Citations

Bibliography

 
 
 
 
 
 
 
 
 
 
 

 

1206 births
1253 deaths
13th-century dukes of Bavaria
People from Kelheim
People temporarily excommunicated by the Catholic Church
House of Wittelsbach
Counts Palatine of the Rhine
German Roman Catholics